All of Me is a 1984 American fantasy comedy film directed by Carl Reiner and starring Steve Martin and Lily Tomlin. This film is based on the unpublished novel Me Two by Edwin Davis.  The title song and theme of the movie is the 1931 jazz standard "All of Me".

Plot
Dissatisfied 38-year-old attorney Roger Cobb (Martin) is dating his boss' daughter and is also an aspiring jazz guitarist. A difficult, eccentric millionairess named Edwina Cutwater (Tomlin) has been bedridden since childhood. Edwina, who has employed Roger's law firm to manage her estate, asks him to make some unusual final arrangements to her will.

Having discovered she is dying, Edwina has enlisted the aid of a culture-shocked mystic named Prahka Lasa (Richard Libertini), who has mastered the secret of transferring human souls. She has made an arrangement with Terry Hoskins (Victoria Tennant), a beautiful young woman. Edwina wants her own soul placed in Terry's vacated body so that she can finally experience youth and health. Terry, who expresses discontent with the material world, will have her soul released to the universe. Roger is to change Edwina's will so that Terry, as Edwina's future self, is her sole beneficiary. Unsurprisingly, Roger believes the whole plan is "bananas".

Edwina dies at the law office. The soul-transfer works, but the bowl temporarily holding her soul falls out the window and hits Roger. Roger ends up with Edwina's soul sharing his body. She has control over the right side of his body and he the left. She causes him to lose both his girlfriend and his job. Besides being able to hear her thoughts, Roger talks to Edwina's image that appears in mirrors and other reflective surfaces. Their relationship gradually warms up, but both of them want Edwina out of his body. Meanwhile, Terry is shocked to learn that the soul transference really works, as she admits she only agreed to it to get Edwina's fortune. Terry tries to prevent Roger from finding the guru by sending him to the airport with a plane ticket, but when the holy man shows up again unexpectedly, she refuses to cooperate.

Roger pledges to help Edwina transfer to Terry's body as originally planned with the guru's help. They, along with Tyrone Wattell (Jason Bernard), Roger's blind friend and fellow musician, pose as band members and sneak into a party Terry is throwing at her mansion, newly inherited from the deceased Edwina.

Guru Prahka successfully transfers Edwina's spirit back into the bowl, but when Roger attempts to force Terry to touch the bowl, it is flung into a bucket of water, transferring Edwina into the liquid. Prahka explains that he must repair the dented bowl before her soul can be transferred again. Terry summons security to apprehend Roger and the bucket. Roger flees and pours the water into a pitcher, which he gives to Tyrone for safekeeping.

Roger allows himself to be caught with the bucket, which he has filled with ordinary water. Terry, however, appears with the pitcher, which she empties into a flower bed. Believing Edwina to be lost forever, Roger despondently wanders around the mansion as the party continues into the night.

When he reunites with Tyrone, Roger discovers that his friend, mistaking the water for gin, had drunk from the pitcher before Terry took it, thereby transferring Edwina into his own body. Guru Prahka, having repaired the bowl, sends Edwina back into Roger.

Roger, Prahka and Tyrone sneak into Terry's bedroom to attempt another transference, but she meets them at the door with a loaded gun. She intends to kill Roger and pass him off as an intruder, but Roger manages to gain the upper hand. In the course of the struggle another guest's life is threatened and he threatens to call the police. It is revealed that the discontent with the world Terry referred to included a storied criminal record, and rather than go to jail for life as a "three-strikes loser," Terry consents to having her soul placed into the body of her favorite horse and to let Edwina take up residence in her body as originally planned. The final shot shows Roger and Edwina (who now resides in Terry's body) dancing together.

Cast
 Steve Martin as Roger Cobb 
 Lily Tomlin as Edwina Cutwater 
 Madolyn Smith as Peggy Schuyler 
 Victoria Tennant as Terry Hoskins 
 Richard Libertini as Prahka Lasa 
 Dana Elcar as Burton Schuyler, Roger's boss
 Jason Bernard as Tyrone Wattell , Roger's blind musician friend
 Selma Diamond as Margo , Roger's secretary
 Eric Christmas as Fred Hoskins, Terry's father
 Gailard Sartain as Fulton Norris 
 Neva Patterson as Gretchen 
 Michael Ensign as Mr. Mifflin 
 Peggy Feury as Dr. Betty Ahrens

In an interview, Martin described his sense of his character Roger Cobb: "This man is not an idiot. He is a contemporary person with some brains, [...] he's not naive or a victim of circumstances. He's an intelligent man who happens to get caught in a disaster. That's a big difference between this role and any other part I've played. [...] For the first time I'm in a story with a beginning, middle, and end. It's old-fashioned and solid [...] This movie was like going to school. I learned a lot about structure and character." He stated in Steve Martin: The Magic Years, "My mature film career started with All of Me and ends with L.A. Story."

Reception
The film received an 85% "Certified Fresh" Rotten Tomatoes score based on forty-one reviews. The site's consensus states: "A high-concept farce carried by Carl Reiner's deft direction and the precise timing of its leads, All of Me is a body-swap comedy worth holding onto." On release, The New York Times described the film: "Some things simply have to be seen to be believed, and the sensational teamwork of Steve Martin and Lily Tomlin in All of Me is one of them [...] Mr. Martin's astonishing performance is the film's most conspicuous asset, but the entire cast is good."<ref Name="NYT">[https://movies.nytimes.com/movie/review?res=9E05EEDA143AF932A1575AC0A962948260 All of Me. New York Times film review. September 21, 1984]. Accessed 2010-08-12</ref>

Accolades

Following the film
Steve Martin and Victoria Tennant met during the making of the film and were married in 1986, staying together until 1994.Movieline interview with Steve Martin 1991-01-02  But Seriously Folks.  Accessed 2010-08-12

Home media
Ironically, for one of Steve Martin's most noted films, this has not had anything but a low-resolution 4:3 full frame transfer released on DVD in 2003.

 Remake 
In 2012, DreamWorks announced that a remake of All of Me was currently in the works, with Abby Kohn and Marc Silverstein writing and John Davis producing.

Television series
As of October 2015, NBC planned to develop a television series of All of Me'' with Betsy Thomas serving as writer and executive producer/showrunner of the show.

References

External links

 
 
 
 
 

1984 films
1980s fantasy comedy films
1984 romantic comedy films
1980s romantic fantasy films
American fantasy comedy films
American romantic comedy films
American romantic fantasy films
1980s English-language films
Films scored by Patrick Williams
Films directed by Carl Reiner
Universal Pictures films
Body swapping in films
Films based on American novels
1980s American films
Films about disability